You Don't Mess with the Zohan is a 2008 American satirical action comedy film directed by Dennis Dugan, written by Adam Sandler, Robert Smigel, and Judd Apatow, produced by Sandler and Jack Giarraputo, and starring Sandler, John Turturro, Emmanuelle Chriqui, Nick Swardson, Lainie Kazan, and Rob Schneider. It was the fourth film that included a collaboration of Sandler as actor and Dugan as director. The film tells the story of an Israeli army counter terrorist commando with superhuman traits who fakes his own death in order to pursue his dream of becoming a hairstylist in New York City while contending with a crooked businessman, a superhuman terrorist, and the grudge of a taxi driver.

Produced by Happy Madison Productions, You Don't Mess with the Zohan was released on June 6, 2008, in the United States, and on August 15, 2008, in the United Kingdom, by Columbia Pictures. The film was a box office success, grossing $204.3 million worldwide from a $90 million budget. Despite this, however, the film received mixed reviews.

Plot
Zohan Dvir is a promiscuous, superhuman Israeli counter-terrorist of the Israel Defense Forces. Despite his success and popularity, he has grown tired of the everlasting conflicts in his country and dreams of becoming a hairstylist at Paul Mitchell's in the United States. He finally admits to his parents his desire to cut hair, but they make fun of him.

During his next mission against a Palestinian terrorist group led by his arch-enemy superhuman Fatoush "Phantom" Hakbarah, Zohan fakes his own death and smuggles himself onto a plane to New York City, cuts his hair, and adopts the alias "Scrappy Coco" after two dogs (Scrappy and Coco) whom he shared the flight with. Following his "success" at killing Zohan, Phantom opens a restaurant chain called Phantom Muchentuchen.

After his arrival in the United States, Zohan immediately goes to Paul Mitchell's salon to ask for a job where the stylists laugh at him. He tries other salons, but is also refused due to his lack of experience. Zohan befriends a Jewish man named Michael after defending him against a bullying motorist and is taken in by him and his mother Gail. Zohan and Gail have sex, much to Michael's disapproval.

Zohan then meets a fellow Israeli immigrant named Oori at a disco. Oori recognizes Zohan but vows to keep his identity a secret and brings him to an area in lower Manhattan populated by other Middle Eastern immigrants, including Palestinian and Israeli Americans. Zohan attempts to secure a job with the struggling salon of a Palestinian woman named Dalia, but she only allows Zohan to sweep the floors. When a stylist named Nadira unexpectedly quits, one of the customers asks Zohan to cut her hair. Zohan proceeds to give her a sexually charged but exceptional haircut and has sex with her in the bathroom. Zohan's reputation spreads rapidly among the elderly women of lower Manhattan, causing Dalia's business to prosper which upsets Grant Walbridge, a corporate businessman who has been trying to buy out all the local tenants on the block so that he can build a massive mall with a roller coaster in it.

Zohan is eventually identified by a Palestinian taxi driver named Salim who bears a grudge against Zohan for having taken his beloved goat away in Palestine because Salim spat on him. Salim convinces his friends Hamdi and Nasi to help him kill Zohan. After several failed attempts, they are forced to contact Phantom and convince him to visit New York to find Zohan.

Meanwhile, Zohan has fallen in love with Dalia and comes clean to her, Michael, and Gail about his true identity. After Dalia rejects Zohan for his counter-terrorist background, Zohan decides to leave to protect her and confronts Phantom in a championship Hacky Sack game sponsored by Walbridge. Zohan's fight is cut short with sudden news of the Middle Eastern neighborhood being attacked and he quickly departs.

As their businesses burn, Zohan calms the Israelis and Palestinians who each blame the other for the violence and makes peace with Salim. Phantom then appears and confronts Zohan, but Zohan refuses to fight. Dalia appears where she reveals that she is Phantom's sister, and convinces her brother to cooperate with Zohan against the arsonists, revealed to be racist white supremacists led by James T. O'Scanlon. They were hired by Walbridge to instigate an inter-ethnic riot so he can get his new mall in the aftermath. As Zohan and Phantom work to save the block, Phantom admits that he always wanted to be a shoe salesman rather than a terrorist. Although the racist arsonists are defeated and Walbridge is arrested by the police, the overexcited Phantom accidentally destroys all of the shops on the block with his powerful screams.

With the Israelis and Palestinians united, the block is rebuilt and transformed into a collectively-owned mall. Phantom opens a shoe shop there, Oori relocates his electronics shop to the mall, Salim gets back his goat from Zohan and starts a goat ride business, and Michael becomes a hairdresser. Zohan and Dalia, having now married, open a beauty salon together. Zohan's parents arrive and approve of his new job and lifestyle before his father requests that he cut his hair, which Zohan happily does.

Cast

Cameos

Production

Sandler, Robert Smigel, and Judd Apatow wrote the first draft of the script in 2000, but the movie was delayed after the events of 9/11 because those involved felt that the subject would be too sensitive. Apatow left the project after the first draft in 2000 to work on his show Undeclared and had, for the most part, not been involved in the project since. The film is based in part on the story of Nezi Arbib, an Israeli soldier who after his service moved to southern California and opened a hair salon. Sandler trained with Arbib and his brothers, also former soldiers, for two weeks to learn hairstyling and work with clients. The movie features elements that first appeared in the SNL sketches "Sabra Shopping Network" and "Sabra Price Is Right", which starred Tom Hanks and were written by Robert Smigel. They originated lines such as 'Sony guts' and 'Disco, Disco, good, good'. The first sketch is also notable for featuring one of Adam Sandler's first (uncredited) television appearances while the second featured Sandler, Schneider, Smigel and Kevin Nealon in supporting parts. Robert Smigel worked with Sandler on past films including Billy Madison, Happy Gilmore, and Little Nicky, but this was the first time in which he was credited for helping to write the script. He was also an executive producer on the film which allowed him to further contribute to the movie's comedic sensibility. The Israeli newspaper Haaretz commented that the movie was known in Hollywood circles as "the Israeli movie". Haaretz also noted that while "Israeli actors were rushing to audition [for the movie]," the response among Arab actors was far from enthusiastic. (Emmanuelle Chriqui, who played Zohan's Palestinian love interest, was raised as an Orthodox Jew.) The film poked fun at the popularity of hummus in Israeli culture. In the movie, characters used it to brush their teeth and as a method to douse the flames of a fire, as well as a hair care product.

Soundtrack
Rupert Gregson-Williams composed the film's score, which he recorded with the Hollywood Studio Symphony at the Sony Scoring Stage in April 2008. The soundtrack contains many songs in Hebrew, mostly by the popular Israeli band Hadag Nahash, the psychedelic trance duo Infected Mushroom, and Dana International. The film features "Strip" by Adam Ant, "Look on the Floor (Hypnotic Tango) (Angel City Remix)" by Bananarama, the Ace of Base songs "Hallo Hallo" and "Beautiful Life", the Rockwell song Somebody's Watching Me and Mariah Carey songs "Fantasy" and "I'll Be Lovin' U Long Time".

The soundtrack contains (near the end) music re-arranged for the movie by Julius Dobos, based on the song "Jimmy Jimmy Jimmy Aaja" from the Bollywood movie Disco Dancer (1982) starring Mithun Chakraborty.

Reception
Rotten Tomatoes gives the film a score of 37% based on 190 reviews. The site's consensus is that the film "features intermittent laughs, and will please Sandler diehards, but after a while the leaky premise wears thin." Metacritic gives the film a rating of 54 out of 100, based on 37 reviews—indicating mixed or average reviews. Audiences polled by CinemaScore gave the film a grade B− on scale of A to F.

John Podhoretz, in The Weekly Standard, wrote that the movie has a "mess" of a plot and features, "as usual for Sandler, plenty of dumb humor of the sort that gives dumb humor a bad name, but that delights his 14-year-old-boy fan base." But the film also has an "unusual" amount of "tantalizing comic ideas" so that "every 10 minutes or so, it makes you explode with laughter." Entertainment Weekly gave the movie a C+ grade, calling it "another 'mess' from Sandler" which is, unlike Monty Python, a "circus that never flies".

On the positive side, Time called the film to be a "laff scuffle". Roger Ebert of the Chicago Sun-Times gave the film 3 out of 4 stars, and called it "a mighty hymn of and to vulgarity, and either you enjoy it, or you don't." Ebert admitted "I found myself enjoying it a surprising amount of the time, even though I was thoroughly ashamed of myself." David Edelstein of New York Magazine went as far as to say "Adam Sandler is mesmerizing". A.O. Scott of The New York Times said it was "the finest post-Zionist action-hairdressing sex comedy I have ever seen."

Box office
You Don't Mess with the Zohan grossed $38 million on its opening weekend, ranked second behind Kung Fu Panda. , it reached a US tally of $100 million. The film grossed $204.3 million worldwide.

Home media 
The film was released on DVD on October 7, 2008, with a 2-disc unrated edition, a single-disc unrated edition, and a theatrical edition, as well as a Blu-ray edition and UMD for PSP. It has sold over 1.2 million DVD units gathering revenue of $26 million.

References

External links

 
 

2008 films
2008 black comedy films

2000s English-language films
Columbia Pictures films
Happy Madison Productions films
Relativity Media films
Films directed by Dennis Dugan
Films set in Israel
Films set in New York City
Films shot in Israel
Films shot in Los Angeles
Films shot in Mexico
Films shot in New York City
American interfaith romance films
Israeli–Palestinian conflict films
Films about hairdressers
Films about Jews and Judaism
Films about Islam
Films with screenplays by Judd Apatow
Films with screenplays by Adam Sandler
Films with screenplays by Robert Smigel
American political satire films
Films produced by Adam Sandler
American black comedy films
Films scored by Rupert Gregson-Williams
2008 comedy films
2000s American films